The Men's 800 metres event  at the 2008 IAAF World Indoor Championships was held between 7–9 March.

Medalists

Heats

Semifinals

Final

References 

Results

800 metres at the World Athletics Indoor Championships
800 metres Men